May Corner is an unincorporated community located in the town of Grover, Marinette County, Wisconsin, United States.

Geography

Bundy Creek, a tributary of the Peshtigo River, flows through the settlement. May Corner is connected to a frontage road of U.S. Route 41 to the east, County Trunk Highway M to the south, and County Trunk Highway W to the west. The Grover town hall is located to the west, and Grover Community Church stands to the south.

Name
May Corner is named after the May farm, which stood on the south side of the intersection. It was owned by Sam G. May (1839–1910), and later by his widow Janet "Jennie" May, née McFarlane (1853–1926).

References

External links

Unincorporated communities in Marinette County, Wisconsin
Unincorporated communities in Wisconsin